Aventi Technology is a Norwegian private company headquartered at Økern in Oslo, Norway. The company specialises in industrial automation and is active in the Road traffic, Energy and environment, as well as Oil and gas sectors.

Projects
Aventi is an active bidder to contracts issued by the Norwegian Public Roads Administration or subcontractors thereof, including automation solutions for the Bjørvika Tunnel and Festning Tunnel projects as well as road development and upgrade work, e.g. the Boksrud-Minnesund connection on E6.

References

Companies based in Oslo
Manufacturers of industrial automation
Norwegian brands